The Marman Twin was a motorcycle produced by Marman Products of Inglewood, California (owned by Herbert "Zeppo" Marx) in 1948 and 1949. The engine was a drone airplane engine from World War II, manufactured by Jack & Heintz Aircraft Co.

See also
List of motorcycles of the 1940s
List of motorcycles of the 1950s

References

External links

Motorcycles of the United States
Motorcycles introduced in the 1940s